Eugène Parlier (13 February 1929 – 30 October 2017) was a Swiss football goalkeeper who played for Switzerland in the 1954 FIFA World Cup. He also played for Neuchâtel Xamax, Servette FC, Urania Genève Sport, FC Biel-Bienne, FC Lausanne-Sport, and Étoile Carouge FC.

References

External links
FIFA profile

1930 births
2017 deaths
Swiss men's footballers
Switzerland international footballers
Association football goalkeepers
Neuchâtel Xamax FCS players
Servette FC players
Urania Genève Sport players
FC Biel-Bienne players
FC Lausanne-Sport players
Étoile Carouge FC players
1954 FIFA World Cup players
Swiss Super League players
People from Montreux
Sportspeople from the canton of Vaud